Coming Over may refer to:

"Coming Over", song by Chuck Fenda ft. Cherine Anderson  #1 on the Jamaican charts 2006
"Coming Over" (Exo song), Japanese song by Exo 2016
"Coming Over" (Dillon Francis and Kygo song), 2016 song based on "Coming Over" by James Hersey 2014